Walter Denison (10 November 1870 – 2 October 1954) was a New Zealand lawn bowls player who won a gold medal in the men's pair at the 1938 British Empire Games.

Early life
Born in Auckland on 10 November 1870, Denison was the son of Mary and William Denison. As a young man, he was active as a swimmer, rower, wrestler and boxer, and in later life he was a timekeeper for the Auckland Wrestling Association for 20 years.

On 14 October 1896, Denison married Frances Mitcham, and the couple had eight children.

Career 
A member of the Balmoral Bowling Club in Auckland, Denison served as the club president from 1925 to 1926. He represented New Zealand in the men's pairs at the 1938 British Empire Games in Sydney, winning the gold medal alongside Lance Macey. At the same games, Denison's son, Oswald, won a bronze medal representing New Zealand in the men's rowing eight.

Outside of bowls, Denison was a jeweller. With William Brackenbury Kirkman, he founded the retail and manufacturing firm of Kirkman and Denison Jewellers in the 1890s, and he continued the business by himself after Kirkman's retirement. He served as vice-commodore of the Waitemata Boating Club and the Manukau Cruising Club at various times.

Denison died in Auckland on 2 October 1954, and was survived by his wife. His ashes were buried at Waikumete Cemetery.

References

1870 births
1954 deaths
Sportspeople from Auckland
New Zealand male bowls players
Commonwealth Games gold medallists for New Zealand
Bowls players at the 1938 British Empire Games
Commonwealth Games medallists in lawn bowls
Burials at Waikumete Cemetery
19th-century New Zealand people
20th-century New Zealand people
Medallists at the 1938 British Empire Games